Rosa Gloria Chagoyán; is a Mexican actress and singer of Armenian descent.

Biography

Chagoyán started her career as a radio host. She entered the world of acting in 1973 as an actress in El Diablo en Persona and appeared in some low-budget films throughout the seventies. She became known for the character 'Lola la trailera' (Lola, the truck driver) that made her a Mexican action film icon. Chagoyán lived in the United States for several years. She returned to Mexico to participate in Central de abasto, a 2009 Mexican telenovela.

Chagoyán is married to Mexican actor and producer Rolando Fernández. They have a son, the singer Emilio Fernández.

Filmography

Films 
 Instructions Not Included (2013)
 Juana la cubana (1994)
 Lola the Truck Driver 3 (1991)
 La vengadora 2 (1991)
 La guerrera vengadora  (1988)
 La rielera (1988)
 pistoleros asesinos (1986)
 Río de oro (1986)
 Maten al fugitivo (1986)
 El secuestro de Lola (1985)
 Cruz de olvido (1984)
 Los humillados (1984)
 Lola the Truck Driver (1983)
 Las ovejas descarriadas (1983)
 Mi abuelo, mi perro y yo (1983)
 Los cuates de la Rosenda (1982)
 Herencia de muerte (1981)
 El caín del Bajío (1981)
 El látigo contra las momias asesinas (1980)
 Pesadilla mortal (1980)
 Ay Chihuahua no te rajes! (1980)
 El jinete de la muerte (1980)
 El cortado (1979)
 Alguien tiene que morir (1979)
 Un cura de locura (1979)
 El giro, el pinto y el colorado (1979)
 El taxista millonario (1979)
 El circo de Capulina (1978)
 Mariachi - Fiesta de Sangre (1977)
 Los desarraigados (1976)
 Presagio (1975)
 El caballo torero (1973)
 El diablo en persona (1973)

Telenovelas 
 Amor de Juventud (2015) Main Antagonist
 La Consentida (2014) Main Antagonist 
 Sortilegio (2009)
 Central de abasto (2009)
 Playa tropical (2002)
 Dos a quererse (1977)
 Mundos opuestos (1975)

Discography 
 Rosa Gloria y sus Traileros (1991)

References

External links
 Biografía en esmas.com (in Spanish)
 
 Reportaje en TV Azteca (in Spanish)

Living people
Actresses from Mexico City
Mexican film actresses
Mexican telenovela actresses
Mexican people of Armenian descent
Year of birth missing (living people)